The 2005 Presidents Cup was held between September 22 and 25, 2005. It was played at the Robert Trent Jones Golf Club in Gainesville, Virginia, United States. The United States team won the competition by a margin of 18–15. The honorary chairmen was former President of the United States George H. W. Bush.

Format
Both teams had 12 players plus a non-playing captain. The competition was four days long with 34 total matches worth a single point each.  Although the number and type of matches played was the same as in previous events, the schedule was slightly altered. Six foursome matches were played on the first day and six four-ball matches were played on the second.  On the third day, five four-ball matches were played in the morning and five foursome matches were played in the afternoon. The competition concluded with twelve singles matches on the final day.  Because of the unresolved outcome in the previous President's Cup, an additional change was made to the structure.  Under the new format, the singles matches would go to extra holes if at the conclusion of the 18 hole round the match was all-square and the Cup had not been decided.

Teams

Ernie Els, who was the second ranked player in the International team, did not play because of a knee injury.

OWGR as of September 18, 2005, the last ranking before the Cup

Thursday's matches
All matches played were foursomes.

Friday's matches
All matches played were four-ball.

Saturday's matches

Morning foursomes

Afternoon four-ball

Sunday's matches

Singles

Individual player records
Each entry refers to the win–loss–half record of the player.

United States

International

External links
Official scores

Presidents Cup
Golf in Virginia
Presidents Cup
Presidents Cup
Presidents Cup